The 9th ACTRA Awards were presented on April 9, 1980. The ceremony was hosted by Dave Broadfoot.

Television

Radio

Journalism and special awards

References

1980 in Canadian television
ACTRA
ACTRA Awards